Thomas Seymour may refer to:

 Thomas Seymour, 1st Baron Seymour of Sudeley (1508–1549), English nobleman
 Thomas H. Seymour (1807–1868), U.S. Representative from Connecticut
 Thomas Day Seymour (1848–1907), American classical scholar
 Thomas Edward Seymour (born 1977), composer
 Thomas Seymour (1896–1984), British director who worked under the name Walter Forde
 Tommy Seymour (footballer) (1906-1983), English footballer, trainer and physio
 Tommy Seymour (born 1988), Scottish rugby player
 Thomas Seymour (MP) (died 1535), MP for London, 1529

See also 
 Thomas Seamer (1632–1712), founding settler of Norwalk, Connecticut